Lord Robert de Scales (1372–1402) was involved in an expedition to Aquitaine. He was Commissioner of the Peace for Norfolk from 1399 to 1401, and was the steward of the son and heir of Thomas de Mowbray, 1st Duke of Norfolk due to his minority. He was one of the Peers who voted for Henry Bolingbroke to be crowned King of England. Due to poor health, Robert died at the age of 30 on 7 December 1402.

Residences
Robert held Rivenhall in Essex, Newsells in Hertfordshire, Haslingfield, Cambridgeshire, Wylton in Norfolk and Dalham in Suffolk.

Family
Robert married Elizabeth, daughter of William, 4th Baron Bardolf. They had the following children:-

 Richard de Scales, held Wetherden, Suffolk from 1401 to 1402
 Robert de Scales, 6th Baron Scales (died 1418)
 Lord Thomas de Scales, 7th Baron Scales (1397–1460)

References

1402 deaths
1372 births
Barons Scales